Kimmins is a surname of Scottish and Irish origin. Notable people with the surname include:

Anthony Kimmins (1901–1964), British director, playwright, screenwriter, producer and actor
Brian Kimmins (1899–1979), British military commander
Charles William Kimmins (1856-1948), British educational psychologist
 (1905-1985), British entomologist
Liz Kimmins, Northern Irish politician
Grace Kimmins (1870–1954), British writer 
Simon Kimmins (born 1930), British cricketer

See also
Kimmins, Tennessee

References

Surnames of Scottish origin
Surnames of Irish origin
Surnames of British Isles origin